The 1919 Colorado Silver and Gold football team was an American football team that represented the University of Colorado as a member of the Rocky Mountain Conference (RMC) during the 1919 college football season. Head coach Enoch J. Mills led the team in his second and final year to an overall record of 2–3–1 and an identical mark in conference play, placing sixth in the RMC. The team finished in fifth place in the RMC and was outscored by a combined total of 96 to 87.

Schedule

Players
 Alva R. Noggle - left end
 Wilbur Adams - left tackle
 Victor Adams - left guard
 W. B. Franklin- center
 Thomas Hogan - right guard
 Robert Muth - right tackle
 Robert Breckenridge - right end 
 Chester Schrepferman - quarterback
 George Costello - left halfback
 Henry B. Abbett - right halfback
 James Brown - RW
 Raymond Savage - F
 Carl Fulghum - F 
 Warren Thompson - G
 James Lee Willard - HB 
 Robert Starks - HB

References

Colorado
Colorado Buffaloes football seasons
Colorado Silver and Gold football